Deng Yubiao (born 8 June 1997) is a Chinese footballer who currently plays for Chinese Super League side Chongqing Liangjiang.

Club career
Deng Yubiao moved aboard in 2013 and joined Portuguese side Oriental Dragon, who was founded by capital of China. He joined Campeonato de Portugal side Pinhalnovense in July 2016. On 28 August 2016, he made his senior debut in a 1–0 home win against Farense, coming on for Luís Leite in the injury time.

Deng transferred to Chinese Super League side Guangzhou Evergrande Taobao in July 2017. He made his debut for the club on 18 March 2018 in a 1–0 home win over Henan Jianye, coming on as a substitute for Alan Carvalho in the 85th minute.

On 27 February 2019, Deng was loaned to China League One side Guangdong South China Tiger for the 2019 season.

Career statistics
.

Honours

Club
Guangzhou Evergrande
Chinese Super League: 2017
Chinese FA Super Cup: 2018

References

External links
 

1997 births
Living people
Chinese footballers
Footballers from Shanwei
People from Haifeng County
C.D. Pinhalnovense players
Guangzhou F.C. players
Guangdong South China Tiger F.C. players
Cangzhou Mighty Lions F.C. players
Segunda Divisão players
Chinese Super League players
China League One players
Association football midfielders
Chinese expatriate footballers
Expatriate footballers in Portugal
Chinese expatriate sportspeople in Portugal
21st-century Chinese people